Whales use a variety of sounds for communication and sensation. The mechanisms used to produce sound vary from one family of cetaceans to another. Marine mammals, including whales, dolphins, and porpoises, are much more dependent on sound than land mammals due to the limited effectiveness of other senses in water. Sight is less effective for marine mammals because of the particulate way in which the ocean scatters light. Smell is also limited, as molecules diffuse more slowly in water than in air, which makes smelling less effective. However, the speed of sound is roughly four times greater in water than in the atmosphere at sea level. As sea mammals are so dependent on hearing to communicate and feed, environmentalists and cetologists are concerned that they are being harmed by the increased ambient noise in the world's oceans caused by ships, sonar and marine seismic surveys.

The word "song" is used to describe the pattern of regular and predictable sounds made by some species of whales, notably the humpback whale. This is included with or in comparison with music, and male humpback whales have been described as "inveterate composers" of songs that are "'strikingly similar' to human musical traditions". It has been suggested that humpback songs communicate male fitness to female whales. The click sounds made by sperm whales and dolphins are not strictly song, but the clicking sequences have been suggested to be individualized rhythmic sequences that communicate the identity of a single whale to other whales in its group. These clicking sequences reportedly allow the groups to coordinate foraging activities.

Production of sound
Humans produce voiced sounds by passing air through the larynx. Within the larynx, when the vocal cords are brought close together, the passing air will force them to alternately close and open, separating the continuous airstream into discrete pulses of air that are heard as a vibration. This vibration is further modified by speech organs in the oral and nasal cavities, creating sounds which are used in human speech.

Cetacean sound production differs markedly from this mechanism. The precise mechanism differs in the two major suborders of cetaceans: the Odontoceti (toothed whales, including dolphins) and the Mysticeti (baleen whales, including the largest whales such as the blue whale).

Odontocete whales 

Odontocetes produce rapid bursts of high-frequency clicks that are thought to be primarily for echolocation. Specialized organs in an odontocete produce collections of clicks and buzzes at frequencies from 0.2 to 150 kHz to obtain sonic information about its environment. Lower frequencies are used for distance echolocation, due to the fact that shorter wavelengths do not travel as far as longer wavelengths underwater. Higher frequencies are more effective at shorter distances, and can reveal more detailed information about a target. Echoes from clicks convey not only the distance to the target, but also the size, shape, speed, and vector of its movement. Additionally, echolocation allows the odontocete to easily discern the difference between objects that are different in material composition, even if visually identical, by their different densities. Individuals also appear to be able to isolate their own echoes during pod feeding activity without interference from other pod members' echolocations.

Whistles are used for communication, and four- to six-month-old calves develop unique sounds that they use most frequently throughout their lives. Such "signature whistles" are distinctive to the individual and may serve as a form of identification among other odontocetes. Though a large pod of dolphins will produce a wide range of different noises, very little is known about the meaning of the sound. Frankel quotes one researcher who says listening to a school of odontocetes is like listening to a group of children at a school playground.

The multiple sounds odontocetes make are produced by passing air through a structure in the head called the phonic lips. The structure is analogous to the human nasal cavity, but the phonic lips act similarly to human vocal cords, which in humans are located in the larynx. As the air passes through this narrow passage, the phonic lip membranes are sucked together, causing the surrounding tissue to vibrate. These vibrations can, as with the vibrations in the human larynx, be consciously controlled with great sensitivity. The vibrations pass through the tissue of the head to the melon, which shapes and directs the sound into a beam of sound useful in echolocation. Every toothed whale except the sperm whale has two sets of phonic lips and is thus capable of making two sounds independently. Once the air has passed the phonic lips it enters the vestibular sac. From there, the air may be recycled back into the lower part of the nasal complex, ready to be used for sound creation again, or passed out through the blowhole.

The French name for phonic lips, museau de singe, translates literally as "monkey's muzzle", which the phonic lip structure is supposed to resemble. New cranial analysis using computed axial and single photon emission computed tomography scans in 2004 showed, at least in the case of bottlenose dolphins, that air might be supplied to the nasal complex from the lungs by the palatopharyngeal sphincter, enabling the sound creation process to continue for as long as the dolphin is able to hold its breath.

Mysticete whales 
Baleen whales (formally called mysticetes) do not have phonic lip structure. Instead, they have a larynx that appears to play a role in sound production, but it lacks vocal cords, and scientists remain uncertain as to the exact mechanism. The process, however, cannot be completely analogous to humans, because whales do not have to exhale in order to produce sound. It is likely that they recycle air around the body for this purpose. Cranial sinuses may also be used to create the sounds, but again, researchers are currently unsure how.

Vocal plasticity and acoustic behavior
There are at least nine separate blue whale acoustic populations worldwide. Over the last 50 years blue whales have changed the way they are singing. Calls are progressively getting lower in frequency.  For example, the Australian pygmy blue whales are decreasing their mean call frequency rate at approximately 0.35 Hz/year.

The migration patterns of blue whales remains unclear. Some populations appear to be resident in habitats of year-round high productivity in some years, while others undertake long migrations to high-latitude feeding grounds, but the extent of migrations and the components of the populations that undertake them are poorly known.

Sound levels 
The frequency of baleen whale sounds ranges from 10 Hz to 31 kHz. A list of typical levels is shown in the table below.

Purpose of whale-created sounds
While the complex sounds of the humpback whale (and some blue whales) are believed to be primarily used in sexual selection, there are simpler sounds that are created by other species of whales that have an alternative use and are used all year round. Whale watchers have watched mother whales lift their young towards the surface in a playful motion, while making a noise that resembles cooing in humans. This cooing-like noise made by whales seems designed to relax their young and is one of several distinct everyday noises whales are known to make. Unlike some fish such as sharks and dolphins, a toothed whale's sense of smell is absent, causing them to rely heavily on echolocation, both for hunting prey and for navigating the ocean under darkness. This requires the whales to produce noise year round to ensure they are able to navigate around any obstacles they may face such as sunken ships or other animals.

It has also been proven that whales are extremely social creatures. The noises that are made throughout the entire year (the main sounds being whistles, clicks, and pulsed calls) are used to communicate with other members of their pod. Each sound a whale makes could mean something different. The clicking noises whales make are used for navigation .   

The question of whether whales sometimes sing purely for aesthetic enjoyment, personal satisfaction, or 'for art's sake', is considered by some to be "an untestable question".

Song of the humpback whale
 

Two groups of whales, the humpback whale and the subspecies of blue whale found in the Indian Ocean, are known to produce a series of repetitious sounds at varying frequencies known as whale song. Marine biologist Philip Clapham describes the song as "probably the most complex in the animal kingdom."

Male humpback whales perform these vocalizations often during the mating season, and so it is believed the purpose of songs is to aid mate selection.

Interest in whale song was aroused by researchers Roger Payne and Scott McVay after the songs were brought to their attention by a Bermudian named Frank Watlington who was working for the US government at the SOFAR station listening for Russian submarines with underwater hydrophones off the coast of the island. Payne released the best-selling Songs of the Humpback Whale in 1970, and the whale songs were quickly incorporated into human music by, among others, singer Judy Collins.

The songs follow a distinct hierarchical structure. The base units of the song (sometimes loosely called the "notes") are single uninterrupted emissions of sound that last up to a few seconds. These sounds vary in frequency from 20 Hz to upward of 24 kHz (the typical human range of hearing is 20 Hz to 20 kHz). The units may be frequency modulated (i.e., the pitch of the sound may go up, down, or stay the same during the note) or amplitude modulated (get louder or quieter). However, the adjustment of bandwidth on a spectrogram representation of the song reveals the essentially pulsed nature of the FM sounds.

A collection of four or six units is known as a sub-phrase, lasting perhaps ten seconds (see also phrase (music)). A collection of two sub-phrases is a phrase. A whale will typically repeat the same phrase over and over for two to four minutes. This is known as a theme. A collection of themes is known as a song. The whale song will last up to 30 or so minutes, and will be repeated over and over again over the course of hours or even days. This "Russian doll" hierarchy of sounds suggests a syntactic structure that is more human-like in its complexity than other forms of animal communication like bird songs, which have only linear structure.

All the whales in an area sing virtually the same song at any point in time and the song is constantly and slowly evolving over time. For example, over the course of a month a particular unit that started as an upsweep (increasing in frequency) might slowly flatten to become a constant note. Another unit may get steadily louder. The pace of evolution of a whale's song also changes—some years the song may change quite rapidly, whereas in other years little variation may be recorded.

Whales occupying the same geographical areas (which can be as large as entire ocean basins) tend to sing similar songs, with only slight variations. Whales from non-overlapping regions sing entirely different songs.

As the song evolves, it appears that old patterns are not revisited. An analysis of 19 years of whale songs found that while general patterns in song could be spotted, the same combination never recurred.

Humpback whales may also make stand-alone sounds that do not form part of a song, particularly during courtship rituals. Finally, humpbacks make a third class of sound called the feeding call. This is a long sound (5 to 10 s duration) of near constant frequency. Humpbacks generally feed cooperatively by gathering in groups, swimming underneath shoals of fish and all lunging up vertically through the fish and out of the water together. Prior to these lunges, whales make their feeding call. The exact purpose of the call is not known.

Some scientists have proposed that humpback whale songs may serve an echolocative purpose, but this has been subject to disagreement.

Other whale sounds

Humpback whales have also been found to make a range of other social sounds to communicate such as "grunts", "groans", "thwops", "snorts" and "barks".

In 2009, researchers found that blue whale song has been deepening in its tonal frequency since the 1960s. While noise pollution has increased ambient ocean noise by over 12 decibels since the mid-20th century, researcher Mark McDonald indicated that higher pitches would be expected if the whales were straining to be heard.

Short range calls are reported during social and resting periods while long range are more commonly reported during foraging and feeding.

Most other whales and dolphins produce sounds of varying degrees of complexity. Of particular interest is the Beluga (the "sea canary") which produces an immense variety of whistles, clicks and pulses.

Research in Whale Vocalization 
It was previously thought that most baleen whales make sounds at about 15–20 hertz. However, a team of marine biologists, led by Mary Ann Daher of the Woods Hole Oceanographic Institution, reported in New Scientist in December 2004 that they had been tracking a whale in the North Pacific for 12 years that was "singing" at 52 Hz. Scientists have been unable to explain this phenomenon. 52 Hz is a very low sound, it is audible through human ears as a low moaning sound. It was not expected that this whale was a new species, more so this whale indicated that a currently known species potentially has a much wider vocal range than previously thought. There is disagreement in the scientific community regarding the uniqueness of the whale's vocalization and whether it is a member of a hybrid whale such as the well documented blue and fin whale hybrids.

Human interaction

Researchers use hydrophones (often adapted from their original military use in tracking submarines) to ascertain the exact location of the origin of whale noises. Their methods also allow them to detect how far through an ocean a sound travels. Research by Dr. Christopher Clark of Cornell University conducted using military data showed that whale noises travel for thousands of kilometres. As well as providing information about song production, the data allows researchers to follow the migratory path of whales throughout the "singing" (mating) season. An important finding is that whales, in a process called the Lombard effect, adjust their song to compensate for background noise pollution. Moreover, there is evidence that blue whales stop producing foraging D calls once a mid-frequency sonar is activated, even though the sonar frequency range (1–8 kHz) far exceeds their sound production range (25–100 Hz).

Prior to the introduction of human noise production, Clark says the noises may have travelled right from one side of an ocean to the other, agreeing with a thirty-year-old concept blaming large-scale shipping. His research indicates that ambient noise from boats is doubling with each decade. This has the effect of reducing the range at which whale noises can be heard. Environmentalists fear that such boat activity is putting undue stress on the animals as well as making it difficult to find a mate.

In the past decade, many effective automated methods, such as signal processing, data mining, and machine learning techniques have been developed to detect and classify whale vocalizations.

Media

Selected discography

 Songs of the Humpback Whale (SWR 118) was originally released in 1970 by CRM Records from recordings made by Roger Payne, Frank Watlington, and others. The LP was later re-released by Capitol Records, published in a flexible format in the National Geographic Society magazine, Volume 155, Number 1, in January 1979, re-released by Living Music/Windham Hill/BMG Records on CD in 1992, and remastered on CD by BGO-Beat Goes On in 2001.
 Deep Voices: The Second Whale Record (Capitol/EMI Records 0777 7 11598 1 0) was released on LP in 1977 from additional recordings made by Roger Payne, and re-released on CD in 1995 by Living Music/Windham Hill/BMG Records. It includes recordings of humpbacks, blues, and rights.
 Northern Whales (MGE 19) was released by Music Gallery Editions from recordings made by Pierre Ouellet, John Ford, and others affiliated with Interspecies Music and Communication Research. It includes recordings of belugas, narwhals, orca, and bearded seals.
 Sounds of the Earth: Humpback Whales (Oreade Music) was released on CD in 1999.
 Rapture of the Deep: Humpback Whale Singing (Compass Recordings) was released on CD in 2001.
Songlines: Songs of the East Australian Humpback whales. was released in 2009.

History
Whaling Captain Wm. H. Kelly was the first person known to recognize whale singing for what it was, while on the brig Eliza in the Sea of Japan in 1881.

See also

52-hertz whale
Bioacoustics
Biomusic
Underwater acoustics
Vocal learning

References

General references

Lone whale's song remains a mystery, New Scientist, issue number 2477, 11 December 2004
 
 Helweg, D.A., Frankel, A.S., Mobley Jr, J.R. and Herman, L.M., "Humpback whale song: our current understanding," in Marine Mammal Sensory Systems, J. A. Thomas, R. A. Kastelein, and A. Y. Supin, Eds. New York: Plenum, 1992, pp. 459–483.
In search of impulse sound sources in odontocetes by Ted Cranford in Hearing by whales and dolphins (W. Lu, A. Popper and R. Fays eds.). Springer-Verlag (2000).
Progressive changes in the songs of humpback whales (Megaptera novaeangliae): a detailed analysis of two seasons in Hawaii by K.B.Payne, P. Tyack and R.S. Payne in Communication and behavior of whales. Westview Press (1983)

External links

Voices in the Sea has whale and dolphin sounds and interpretive videos
Cornell University's Bioacoustics Research Program
Right Whale Listening Network, a project of the above bioacoustics program at Cornell
Whale Songs at the Avant Garde Project has FLAC files made from high-quality LP transcriptions.
Perspectives in Ocean Science Listening to Whales, John Hildebrand, Scripps Institution of Oceanography
The British Library Sound Archive contains over 150,000 recordings of animal sounds and natural atmospheres from around the world.
Songlines: Songs of the East Australian Humpback whales.
Recording of the bearded seal's "spiralling trill," one of the most phenomenal vocalizations of the underwater kingdom
Watkins Marine Mammal Sound Database, Woods Hole Oceanographic Institution and New Bedford Whaling Museum

Animal intelligence
Articles containing video clips
Song forms
Whale sounds